Frantz Duval is a Haitian journalist. Duval is the editor-in-chief of the newspaper Le Nouvelliste, both the largest print media in Haiti and sole daily newspaper; the director of the magazine Ticket Magazine and the radio station Magik 9 (100.9 FM).

References

External links 
  Le Nouvelliste: A propos du Nouvelliste (About us)

Living people

Haitian journalists
Year of birth missing (living people)